Stories & Songs is a 2000 album by John McEuen and Jimmy Ibbotson. Both are former members of the Nitty Gritty Dirt Band.

Track listing
"The Richmond Song" (B. Dowe / T. McNaughton) - 4:20
"Grandfather's Clock" (Jimmy Ibbotson) - 1:46
"Campfire story" - 2:27
"Santo Rosa" (Jimmy Ibbotson) - 2:48
"Telluride story" - :19
"Telluride" (Jimmy Ibbotson) - 3:40
"Luncheonette story" - :10
"Luncheonette" (Jimmy Ibbotson) - 3:50
"Saints and Sots story" - 2:15
"Long Hard Road story" (Jimmy Ibbotson) - 5:02
"Long Hard Road" (Jimmy Ibbotson) - 5:02
"Ripplin Waters story" (Jimmy Ibbotson) - 5:02
"Ripplin Waters" (Jimmy Ibbotson) - 5:02
"Dance LIttle Jean story" (Jimmy Ibbotson) - 5:02
"Dance LIttle Jean" (Jimmy Ibbotson) - 5:02
"THe Mountain Whippoorwill In Richmond" (Jimmy Ibbotson) - 5:02
"Blue Ridge Cabin Home" (Jimmy Ibbotson) - 5:02
"Rainy Night In Richmond" (Jimmy Ibbotson) - 5:02

Personnel
Jimmy Ibbotson - Vocals, guitar
John McKuen - Banjo, Guitar, Mandolin
Jim Ratts - Vocals, 
Jim Salestron - Vocals, guitar, ukulele 
with
Harry Bruckner - Bass
Bill Brennan - Drums
Charlie Provenza - Mandolin
Chuck Salestrom - Vocal
Daniel Jones - Pedal Steel Guitar
Ron Jones - Steel Drum
Emelio Roberto Domingues - Hand Drums
Salli Severing Rattbo - Vocals
Ted Cole - Flute
Scott Bennett - Guitar
Kids Chorus - Jill DeLage, Barbara Henry, John BRady, and Rattbo

Production
Producer - Jim Ratts

References
All information from the album liner notes, unless otherwise noted.

2000 albums
Jimmy Ibbotson albums
John McEuen albums